The Very Best of The Doors is the name of:

The Very Best of The Doors (2001 album)
The Very Best of The Doors (2007 album)

See also
The Best of The Doors (disambiguation)